Surviving Grady is a popular blog, detailing the ongoing and occasionally strained relationship between two passionate fans of the Boston Red Sox and their beloved team.
The blog began at the start of the Red Sox' historic 2004 season and swiftly gathered a devoted following, serving as an outlet for a frustrated fanbase to air and share their grievances, disappointments, and eventual triumph.  Entries from the 2004 season were later collected and published in book form.

History

Disgruntled at the Red Sox's dramatic loss to the New York Yankees in the 2003 American League Championship Series, creators "Red" and "Denton" conceived the blog as a space in which to engage with the angst associated with following a team that seemed destined always to disappoint. Daily entries have continued to date, typically exhibiting an off-kilter, and occasionally surreal sense of humor.

The title refers to Grady Little, manager of the Red Sox from 2002-2003, and to Little's controversial decision not to replace pitcher Pedro Martínez in the eighth inning of Game Seven of the 2003 American League Championship Series. The Yankees tied the game on a hit from the very next batter, and went on to win, costing the Red Sox a chance at the World Series and causing great frustration and consternation among the Red Sox fan base.

Style

Surviving Grady, in essence, is a reflective journal of what it feels like to be a fan of the Red Sox.  There are no box scores and little in the way of statistical analysis.  The charm of the blog lies instead in the contributors' idiosyncratic response to the team's fortunes.  Written with wit and warmth, by fans for fans, the site attracts thousands of readers on a daily basis, and has a lively comments section.

Publications
"Surviving Grady" (2005, AiT/PlanetLar)

External links
 Boston Globe: "Sports therapy."  URL accessed 7 May 2007.
 ESPN: "Dodgers hire Grady Little as manager."  URL accessed 7 May 2007.
 Deadspin: "Blogdom's Best: Boston Red Sox." 
 Boston Phoenix: "Red and Denton Come Clean."
 PopImage.com: "INTERVIEW: Tim McCarney"

Boston Red Sox
American sport websites